This list of listed buildings in Lejre Municipality is a list of listed buildings in Lejre Municipality, Denmark.

The list

4000 Roskilde

4060 Kirke Såby

4070 Kirke Hyllinge

4320 Lejre

4330 Hvalsø

4340 Tølløse

References

External links

 Danish Agency of Culture

 
Lejre